"Sweet Suicide Summer Story" is the third indie single by Japanese girl group Melon Kinenbi, in collaboration with Midori. It was released in limited distribution on August 12, 2009. The single was sold on the Tower Records online store with purchasers receiving an original computer wallpaper.

Track listing 
 sweet suicide summer story
 sweet suicide summer story (Instrumental)

References

External links
  

2009 singles
2009 songs